Gottfried Diener (November 1, 1926 – May 26, 2015) was a Swiss bobsledder who competed in the mid-1950s. He won the gold medal in the four-man event at the 1956 Winter Olympics in Cortina d'Ampezzo. Diener also won two gold medals in the four-man event at the FIBT World Championships, winning them in 1954 and 1955. He also served as president of the International Crossbow Shooting Union from 1965 to 1999. Diener was named an honorary president of the organization in 2006.

References
Bobsleigh four-man Olympic medalists for 1924, 1932-56, and since 1964
Bobsleigh four-man world championship medalists since 1930
International Crossbow Shooting Union article on Diener in 2006. - Access July 30, 2007.
Gottfried Diener's obituary 

1926 births
2015 deaths
Olympic bobsledders of Switzerland
Bobsledders at the 1956 Winter Olympics
Olympic gold medalists for Switzerland
Swiss male bobsledders
Olympic medalists in bobsleigh
Medalists at the 1956 Winter Olympics
20th-century Swiss people